In computer science, iterative compression is an algorithmic technique for the design of fixed-parameter tractable algorithms, in which one element (such as a vertex of a graph) is added to the problem in each step, and a small solution for the problem prior to the addition is used to help find a small solution to the problem after the step.

The technique was invented by Reed, Smith and Vetta to show that the problem of odd cycle transversal was solvable in time , for a graph with  vertices,  edges, and odd cycle transversal number .  Odd cycle transversal is the problem of finding the smallest set of vertices of a graph that include at least one vertex from every odd cycle; its parameterized complexity was a longstanding open question.  This technique later proved very useful in showing fixed-parameter tractability results.  It is now considered to be one of the fundamental techniques in the area of parameterized algorithmics.

Iterative compression has been used successfully in many problems, for instance odd cycle transversal (see below) and edge bipartization, feedback vertex set, cluster vertex deletion and directed feedback vertex set.  It has also been used successfully for exact exponential time algorithms for independent set.

Technique
Iterative compression applies, for instance, to parameterized graph problems whose inputs are a graph  and a natural number , and where the problem is to test the existence of a solution (a set of vertices) of size . Suppose
that the problem is closed under induced subgraphs (if a solution of size  exists in a given graph, then a solution of this size or smaller also exists in every induced subgraph) and that there exists an efficient subroutine that determines whether a solution  of size  can be compressed to a smaller solution of size .

If these assumptions are met, then the problem can be solved by adding vertices one at a time to an induced subgraph, and finding the solution to the induced subgraph, as follows:
Start with a subgraph induced by a vertex set  of size , and a solution  that equals  itself.
While , perform the following steps:
Test whether the -vertex solution } to  can be compressed to a -vertex solution.
If it cannot be compressed, abort the algorithm: the input graph has no -vertex solution.
Otherwise, set  to the new compressed solution and continue the loop.

This algorithm calls the compression subroutine a linear number of times. Therefore, if the compression variant is solvable in fixed-parameter tractable time, i.e., f(k) · nc for some constant c, then the iterative compression procedure solving the entire problem runs in f(k) · nc+1 time.
The same technique can be applied to finding sets of edges for graph properties closed under subgraphs (rather than induced subgraph), or for other properties beyond graph theory.

Applications
In their original paper Reed et al. showed how to make a graph bipartite by deleting at most k vertices in time O(3k kmn).  Later, a simpler algorithm was given, also using iterative compression, by Lokshstanov, Saurabh and Sikdar.
In order to compress a deletion set  of size  to a deletion set  of size , their algorithm tests all of the  partitions of  into three subsets: the subset of  that belongs to the new deletion set, and the two subsets of  that belong to the two sides of the bipartite graph that remains after deleting . Once these three sets have been selected, the remaining vertices of a deletion set  (if it exists) can be found from them by applying a max-flow min-cut algorithm.

Vertex cover is another example for which iterative compression can be employed. In the compression variant of the problem, the input is a set  of  vertices that are incident to all edges of the graph, and the algorithm must find a set  of size  with the same property, if it exists. Such a choice can only work if no two removed vertices are adjacent, and for each such choice, the subroutine must include in the cover all the vertices outside   that are incident to an edge that becomes uncovered by this removal. Using this subroutine in an iterative compression algorithm gives a simple  algorithm for vertex cover.

See also
 Kernelization, a different design technique for fixed-parameter tractable algorithms

References

Graph algorithms
Parameterized complexity
Analysis of algorithms